Tatjana Malek and Irena Pavlovic were the defending champions, but Malek chose not to participate. Pavlovic competed with Eirini Georgatou, but lost in the final to Lyudmyla Kichenok and Nadiya Kichenok 6–2, 6–0.

Seeds

Draw

Draw

References
 Main Draw

Open GDF Suez de Touraine - Doubles
Open de Touraine
2011 in French tennis